Rainie Yang Cheng Lin (born 4 June 1984) is a Taiwanese singer, actress, and television host.

Early life
Yang was born and raised in Taipei, Taiwan, her father's ancestors were from Guangdong, China. She spoke Cantonese at home. By the time she was 13, she had to start working because her father's business failed, which led to her parents being divorced. She attended Hwa Kang Arts School which specialized in performance arts.

Career
Yang began her career in 2000 as a member of Taiwanese girl group 4 in Love, where she was given the stage name Rainie. The group's popularity in the musical industry achieved limited success. After they disbanded in 2002, Yang continued to pursue her career in the entertainment industry as a TV host, hosting shows such as the variety show Guess. After playing supporting roles in a series of Taiwanese TV dramas, including the highly popular pan-Asia hit Taiwanese series Meteor Garden and its supplementary mini-series Meteor Rain, she landed the leading role as Qi Yue, in the Taiwanese drama Devil Beside You with Mike He in 2005. In the same year, she released her debut album, My Intuition, featured the hit song "Intuition" as the theme song of Devil Beside You and "Ideal Lover".

In 2006, she released her second album, Meeting Love. On 8 January 2007, Yang recorded her last Guess episode due to her busy schedule and focus on her musical and acting career. Hoping to portray herself as a "serious" actress, Yang co-starred in the lesbian-themed film Spider Lilies with Isabella Leong. However, after co-starring in Spider Lilies, Yang returned to her previous cute image by becoming the leading role in the drama Why Why Love, with Mike He and Kingone Wang, which aired during the summer of 2007. She subsequently released her third album, My Other Self on 7 September 2007. It features the theme song from Why Why Love, "Lacking Oxygen" and the insert song "Perfect Example".

On 23 April 2008, while filming the Taiwanese drama Miss No Good in San Chih, Taiwan, Yang fell heavily from the stairs, and was sent to Mackay Memorial Hospital in Taipei. The stairs were located between the third floor, where the dressing room was located, and the first floor, where the film set was located. The crew originally thought the falling object was a light frame, but upon hearing a groan, they realized it was her. After an X-ray examination, doctors diagnosed Yang's injury as a spinal contusion. After leaving the hospital, producer Angie Chai took Yang to a Chinese massage therapist. Miss No Good, starring Yang and Will Pan, was aired during the fall and winter of 2008 and met with much success. During this period of time, she also released her 4th album, Not Yet a Woman, which features the insert song "Too Much Trouble" and the theme song "Take Me Away" that were featured Miss No Good.

In 2009, Yang starred in To Get Her with Jiro Wang of Fahrenheit and George Hu. Then she filmed The Child's Eye in Thailand, a horror flick directed by the Pang Brothers with Elanne Kong, and also Taiwanese drama Hi My Sweetheart with Show Lo. After promoting Hi My Sweetheart, Yang released her fifth album, Rainie & Love...?, on the New Year's Day of 2010. Due to the success of Devil Beside You and Miss No Good overseas, Yang entered J-pop industry in 2010 by releasing a Japanese version of her hit "Intuition" as her first Japanese-language single.

Yang released her first compilation album, Whimsical World Collection, on 23 April 2010. It consists of 3 new tracks, 35 previously released tracks and 15 music videos from her previous five studio albums. On 22 October 2010, she won Best Actress at the 45th Golden Bell Awards, for her role as Chen Baozhu in Hi My Sweetheart.

In 2011, Yang released her sixth studio album Longing for..., which features the song "We Are All Silly", an interlude of Love You.

In 2012, Yang starred in the romantic short film, Heartbeat Love, with Show Lo. On 17 August 2012, she released her seventh studio album Wishing for Happiness. Her second concert tour, Love Voyage, embarked on 14 December.

On 23 August 2013, Yang released her eighth studio album Angel Wings.

In 2014, Yang signed to EMI Taiwan, a revived label that is now a subsidiary of Universal Music Taiwan. Her ninth studio album, A Tale of Two Rainie, was released on 12 December 2014. In the same year, she starred in the Chinese drama series Love at Second Sight.

On 30 September 2016, her tenth studio album Traces of Time in Love was released. It was nominated for three awards at the 28th Golden Melody Awards, including Song of the Year, Best Lyricist, and Best Single Producer for the title track "Traces of Time in Love". Yang thus joined the list of having been nominated for all three prestigious entertainment awards in Taiwan, namely the Golden Bell Awards (television), the Golden Horse Awards (film) and the Golden Melody Awards (music). In the same year, Yang starred in the Taiwanese television series Life Plan A and B.

On 9 October 2016, Rainie Yang attended the new album autograph session and has voiced that she support the LGBT homosexual marriage equal rights legalization when the Lee Tien-chu has sponsored his anti-gay expression. Yang was annoyance said that homosexuality is not guilty and love is inherently gender of neutral, she also frankly said that she would like to continue play the gay acting roles in the future, it's the honor to have the opportunity for interpretation.

On 27 November 2019, Yang released her eleventh studio album Delete Reset Grow.

On 5 November 2020, Yang release her twelfth studio album Like a Star.

Personal life
Yang dated classmate Alien Huang while they were in high school. Their relationship ended when Yang made her debut in the entertainment industry and dropped out of high school.

In December 2014, she began dating Chinese singer-songwriter Li Ronghao, who wrote the song "Xing Fu Guo Zi" ("幸福果子" ) for Yang in 2007. On 11 July 2019, Li announced that Yang accepted his wedding proposal on his 34th birthday. On 17 September 2019, Yang and Li confirmed they have obtained their marriage license in China.

Controversies 
Rainie expressed her support for the One China Policy on Weibo following the 2022 visit by Nancy Pelosi to Taiwan.

Discography

Studio albums

Compilation albums

Live albums

Singles

Tours

Filmography

Television series

Film

Variety show

Music video appearances

Awards and nominations

Note

References

External links

 
 Rainie Yang on Sina Weibo
 Rainie Yang Official YouTube Channel

1984 births
Living people
Actresses from Taipei
Cantonese people
Musicians from Taipei
Taiwanese film actresses
Taiwanese idols
Taiwanese Mandopop singers
Taiwanese television actresses
21st-century Taiwanese singers
21st-century Taiwanese women singers
Cantonese-language singers of Taiwan